Wu Lingmei (born 16 February 1973) is a Chinese triple jumper.

She won various silver medals at the 1998 Asian Games and the 1999 Summer Universiade. She became the Asian champion in 2002.

Her personal best jump was 14.39 metres, achieved in June 1998 in Beijing.

Competition record

External links

1973 births
Living people
Chinese female triple jumpers
Asian Games medalists in athletics (track and field)
Athletes (track and field) at the 1998 Asian Games
Universiade medalists in athletics (track and field)
Asian Games silver medalists for China
Medalists at the 1998 Asian Games
Universiade silver medalists for China
Medalists at the 1999 Summer Universiade
Competitors at the 2001 Summer Universiade